Incredicoaster is a steel roller coaster at Disney California Adventure in Anaheim, California. Manufactured by Intamin, it opened to the public as California Screamin' in 2001. At 6,072 feet long, is the 6th longest sit down roller coaster in the world as of 2022. At 122 feet high, it is the tallest roller coaster of any Disney resort.

California Screamin' closed on January 8, 2018, and reopened as the Incredicoaster on June 23, 2018, inspired by the 2004 computer-animated film The Incredibles and its 2018 sequel Incredibles 2. Its opening coincided with the debut of the newly revamped Pixar Pier section of the park, where the roller coaster is located. The tubes through which the coaster shoots serve two purposes: In addition to concealing the scenes with characters, they enable the coaster to comply with Orange County sound ordinances, projecting the screams of the riders out of the tube in the direction of the park, away from the rest of Anaheim and the nearby city of Garden Grove.

History
In October 1998, Disney announced that a new theme park would be built next to Disneyland. The steel coaster would also be designed to look like a classic wooden roller coaster. Construction of the attraction began later that year.

California Screamin' debuted with the park's grand opening on February 8, 2001. It also became the longest roller coaster in the world to feature an inversion after the vertical loop on Son of Beast at Kings Island was removed in 2006.

The coaster uses an LIM launch to propel the train up the first hill as well as on the main lift midway through the ride. These motors are used in lieu of a traditional lift hill chain. Since the resort was located next to a residential area, Disney had installed tunnels throughout the ride to block the screams from riders and reduce noise complaints from nearby residents of Anaheim and neighboring Garden Grove.

Like most other coasters in Disney Parks, California Screamin' featured an onboard audio soundtrack during the ride, created by Gary Hoey and George Wilkins. On January 3, 2007, as part of the "Rockin' Both Parks" campaign, the audio track was temporarily replaced by a remixed version of the Red Hot Chili Peppers' "Around the World," and the attraction was renamed Rockin' California Screamin'. This was promoted along with Rockin' Space Mountain, a similar change made to Space Mountain in Disneyland, though that ride's audio was changed to the Red Hot Chili Peppers' cover version of "Higher Ground". The standard audio track was restored when the campaign ended.

The original safety announcements were recorded by Dee Bradley Baker. On November 5, 2010, the announcements were updated with the voice of Neil Patrick Harris. Baker and Harris also recorded audio for the launch, counting down for guests. There are 108 acoustic devices to play the onboard audio aboard each train, including high-range speakers in the headrests, mid-range speakers near riders' ears, and subwoofers under each rider's seat. 

After the refurbishment of Disney California Adventure, from 2008 to 2009 the Mickey Mouse head located behind the vertical loop was changed to a sunburst icon with the Paradise Pier logo.

On July 15, 2017, Disney announced a complete renovation of Paradise Pier, renaming it Pixar Pier. Meanwhile, rumors began to circulate that California Screamin' would be rethemed to Pixar Animation Studios' The Incredibles. On November 2, it was confirmed that the ride would be remodeled. California Screamin' closed on January 8, 2018 for the transformation into Incredicoaster. The remodel would include a new queue line, engineering reboots of the existing launch system, new storyline, enclosed scream tunnels and a new soundtrack. The new trains were unveiled in April. Incredicoaster opened on June 23, 2018 to coincide with the release of Incredibles 2.

Pre-show and ride
Guests enter as TV screens display news footage of the Incredibles and Edna Mode being interviewed for the coaster's rebranding as Incredicoaster. While they are being interviewed, Jack-Jack uses his unpredictable superpowers, much to his family's frustration and Edna's amusement. As the riders board the cars and take off from the station, Elastigirl asks Edna to look after Jack-Jack. The riders pass by the VIP room showing Edna with Jack-Jack as he teleports around. Moments later, Edna announces that Jack-Jack has escaped. The Incredibles then take off throughout the ride trying to catch Jack-Jack as he uses his vast array of super powers to "attack" certain points on the ride as the coaster arrives in the launch area. 

After Dash gives the countdown, the train is launched at 55 mph into the first tunnel, accompanied by a stream of water jets that glow red to simulate Dash's super speed. In the first tunnel, Dash tries to use his super speed to catch Jack-Jack, while Jack-Jack shoots lasers from his eyes. The train then exits the tunnel as it descends the drop and rises uphill onto the first block brake and then navigates a right hand turn around Inside Out Emotional Whirlwind before passing under the outbound track and climbing up the main lift, which uses LIMs to propel the train. This is the first use of Linear Induction Motor (LIM) technology that allows a roller coaster vehicle to travel on an inclined angle.

As the train crests the hill, it enters the second tunnel, where Elastigirl tries using her stretching powers to grab Jack-Jack while he is phasing in and out of the tunnel wall. Past the crest of the hill, Mr. Incredible has used his super strength to smash through the wall and is trying to catch Jack-Jack by offering him a cookie, after which the train drops out of the tunnel. Exiting this tunnel, the ride goes through a three-quarter turn before diving into the vertical loop. Following this, the train dives through the third tunnel, which Jack-Jack has set ablaze with his fire powers, forcing Violet to put an invisible forcefield around the tunnel to put out the flames and keep the riders safe as they make another loop around the Inside Out Emotional Whirlwind. 

After hitting the second block brake section, the track passes through a series of airtime filled bunny hop hills as it passes over Toy Story Midway Mania, where Jack-Jack uses his ability to multiply to make dozens of Jack-Jacks pop up everywhere. The train then rises into the third and final block brake section. After dropping off the block brakes the train traverses through a 270 degree downward spiral that leads into a straight section of track with one last bunny hop. Which is followed by a final 100 degree left turn into the final brake run, as Jack-Jack makes it back safely. This time he has increased in size, but Edna manages to keep him calm by giving him a cookie.

Cast
 Craig T. Nelson as Mr. Incredible
 Holly Hunter as Elastigirl
 Sarah Vowell as Violet Parr
 Huck Milner as Dash Parr
 Brad Bird as Edna Mode

Incidents

In August 2001, Dr. David Heber, a Milwaukee surgeon, suffered a neurological disorder and whiplash after his restraint locked at eye level. He sued Disney in 2003, alleging equipment failure, lack of lubrication and ride operators failing to notice his unlocked restraint. However, Heber lost.

On July 29, 2005, 25 guests were injured when the purple train rear-ended the red train. Of the 48 guests aboard the two trains, 15 were taken to the hospital for treatment of minor injuries. The accident occurred on the section of track about  short of the loading station. A full ride stop was activated with the red train stopped. The brake segment that was supposed to have stopped the purple train failed, and the purple train continued until it collided with the stopped red train. An investigation showed that a faulty brake valve, installed a few days earlier by Disney (not by the ride manufacturer Intamin) was the cause.

On July 22, 2011, 23 people were rescued from California Screamin' by firefighters when a rider's backpack fell out of a train and landed on the track, causing the orange train to valley between the loop and the next block section. It reopened two days later after the train was winched up the next hill, had its damaged wheels replaced and was allowed to complete the circuit.

On August 6, 2016, passengers on the ride were stranded for 45 minutes before being rescued when a fallen purse triggered an automatic stop.

Rankings

Gallery

References

External links 

 
 
 Incrediblecoasters Images
 California Screamin' Details about the roller coaster on Ultimate Rollercoaster.com.

Launched roller coasters
Paradise Pier
Pixar Pier
Roller coasters at Disney California Adventure
Roller coasters manufactured by Intamin
Roller coasters introduced in 2001
Roller coasters that closed in 2018
Roller coasters introduced in 2018
Steel roller coasters
Walt Disney Parks and Resorts attractions
The Incredibles
Roller coasters in California